Antil may refer to:

 Sumit Antil, Indian paralympian and javelin thrower
 Seema Antil alias Seema Punia, Indian discus thrower
 Mandeep Antil, Indian field hockey player
 Tarsem Antil, Indian producer director
 Akash Antil, Indian track and field athlete